The Other Kingdom is a fantasy sitcom created by Thomas W. Lynch that aired on Nickelodeon from April 10, 2016 to June 19, 2016. The series stars Esther Zynn, Callan Potter, Celina Martin, Taylor Adams, and Josette Halpert.

Plot 
Fairy Princess Astral is sent from the Fairy kingdom Athenia to the human world to live as a human, and to attend to a regular high school, for ninety days, after which she must make a decision: go back and eventually assume the throne of Athenia, or remain in the human world and become a human. For her time in the human world, Astral takes the place of a foreign exchange student named Winston who is sent to Athenia in her place.

Cast and characters

Main 
 Esther Zynn as Astral, a fairy princess from the royal kingdom of Athenia who gets a chance to live in the human world and attend high school, where she poses as a foreign exchange student.
 Callan Potter as Tristan, a cute boy in school who is Astral's love interest. He is later revealed to be the lost prince of Spartania.
 Celina Martin as Morgan, Astral's best friend who loves everything fairy related.
 Taylor Adams as Devon, Astral's other friend and with whose family she is staying; it is later revealed that he is half fairy and Astral's cousin.
 Josette Halpert as Hailey, the school's popular girl who is Astral's rival.

Recurring 
 Martin Roach as King Oberon, Astral's father and one of the rulers of Athenia.
 Tori Anderson as Queen Titania, Astral's mother and one of the rulers of Athenia.
 Alvina August as Versitude, advisor to King Oberon and Queen Titania. She is secretive and conniving, and also has a strong dislike of humans.
 C.J. Byrd-Vassell as Winston, a foreign exchange student from England (the one supposed be staying with Devon's family) who stays in Athenia while Astral is in the human world.
 Brett Donahue as Peter Quince, Devon's father; he is later revealed to be King Oberon's older brother who left Athenia because he believes in the technological society of humans.
 Jeff Douglas as Oswald, a knight who watches over Astral while she is the human world. When he is in the human world, he is only 7 inches tall.
 Matt Burns as Brendoni, a troll who is also Astral's cousin and next in line to rule Athenia if Astral decides to stay in the human world. When Brendoni comes to the human world, he is played by Adam Peddle.
 Torri Webster as PeaseBlossom, a wingless fairy who helps Winston in Athenia.

Episodes

Ratings 
 
}}

References

External links 
 

2010s American comedy television series
2010s American teen sitcoms
2010s Nickelodeon original programming
2016 American television series debuts
2016 American television series endings
2010s Canadian teen sitcoms
2016 Canadian television series debuts
2016 Canadian television series endings
American fantasy television series
Canadian fantasy television series
English-language television shows
Television series by DHX Media